Reverend Bizarre was a doom metal band from Finland. Formed in 1995, they played slow and heavy traditional doom with dramatic vocals, following in the footsteps of bands such as Saint Vitus, Pentagram and Black Sabbath. The band was one of the biggest names in 2000s traditional doom metal.

History

Beginnings (1994–1999)

The band was formed in 1994 in Lohja. After their military service, Albert Witchfinder, Peter Vicar and Juippi began playing in autumn 1997. In the summer of 1998, Albert moved to Turku to continue Reverend Bizarre with Vicar. To complete their training, they get back in touch with Earl of Void, at this time recently released from prison. They recorded the Slice of Doom demo in three days (16, 17 and 23 August 1999), which they send to several labels in the hope of signing a contract.

According to Albert Witchfinder, the band had planned three more full-length albums, after their second album – titled Songs from the Funereal World, Heavier Than Life and How It Was Meant to Be – but this plan was scrapped and the band made only one more LP, disbanding Reverend Bizarre "before it started to suck."  The album, III So Long Suckers, was recorded in the first half of 2007, and released in August of that year. The band's last concerts were played during the autumn and winter of 2006 culminating in a final performance in Turku.

Two of the band's EPs, Harbinger of Metal and Return to the Rectory, actually exceed 60 minutes in length.

Disbandment and side projects (2007)
Initially, five albums were planned. On 17 August 2007, after scrapping this plan, the band announced on MySpace their intention to publish their final album III: So Long Suckers. At the end of September 2007, however, they announced the registration and publication of several recordings.

After the break-up of Reverend Bizarre, the band members focus on their other groups and projects. In 2005, Albert Witchfinder became a member of The Puritan as well as a solo project called Opium Warlords, and Peter Vicar founded a new band called Lord Vicar. Both of them released (alongside original material) songs originally meant for Reverend Bizarre and that were to appear on future two albums which were never released. Furthermore, all three members of Reverend Bizarre continue doing music together in Orne (originally known as Mesmer), Vicar's old school progressive rock band in which Void plays the drums. Witchfinder has appeared on vocals on both Orne full-lengths, the 2006 debut The Conjuration by the Fire and the 2011 second album The Tree of Life.

Members
 Albert Witchfinder – vocals, bass
 Peter Vicar – guitar
 Earl of Void – drums, guitar, keyboards

Previous members
Juippi – drums

Discography

Studio albums

EPs and singles

Splits

Demos
 Practice Sessions (unpublished rehearsal tape, 1995)
 Slice of Doom (1999)
 You Shall Suffer! (extremely limited CDr, 2003)

Compilations

References

External links

Reverend Bizarre at MySpace
Reverend Bizarre at Encyclopaedia Metallum
 Reverend Bizarre at Facebook

Finnish heavy metal musical groups
Finnish doom metal musical groups
Musical groups established in 1995
Musical groups disestablished in 2007
Finnish musical trios